The 1985–86 Argentine Primera División was the 95th season of top-flight football in Argentina. The season began on July 6, 1985 and ended on April 20, 1986.

This tournament saw a major reform in Argentine football, as the European calendar was adopted as well as the tournament format. The league title was won by River Plate achieving its 21st league title.

League table

Relegation
Relegation was determined by averaging the number of points obtained over the three previous seasons

Relegation table

Chacarita Juniors were relegated directly
Huracán played in the Octagonal promotion tournament.

Qualification for Copa Libertadores 1986
River Plate qualified as League champions
Argentinos Juniors qualified as Copa Libertadores holders
The remaining qualification place was determined by the Liguella Pre-Libertadores

Liguella Pre-Libertadores
Qualifying round

Quarter-finals

Semi-finals

Final

Boca Juniors qualified for the 1986 Copa Libertadores.

See also
1985-86 in Argentine football

References

Argentine Primera División seasons
1985–86 in Argentine football
Argentine
Argentine